Sweet Lou may refer to:

Sweet Lou (album), a 1974 album by jazz saxophonist Lou Donaldson
 Sweet Lou (horse) (foaled 2009)

People with the nickname
Lou Hudson (1944–2014), former All-Star basketball player 
Louis Dunbar (born 1953), basketball player for the Harlem Globetrotters
Lou Johnson (1934–2020), Major League Baseball player
Lou Piniella (born 1943), Major League Baseball manager and player
Lou Williams (born 1986), NBA basketball player
Lou Whitaker (born 1957), Major League Baseball player
Lou Singer, a main character in the 2003 movie Grind